Velyki Hrybovychi is a village in Lviv Raion, Lviv Oblast in western Ukraine. It belongs to Lviv urban hromada, one of the hromadas of Ukraine. The population of the village is about 1704 people. Local government is administered by Hrybovytska village council.

Geography 

History 
The first written mention dates back to year 1440.
In the village was a Greek Catholic parish but the Roman Catholic parish was in a nearby village Malekhiv.

Until 18 July 2020, Velyki Hrybovychi belonged to Zhovkva Raion. The raion was abolished in July 2020 as part of the administrative reform of Ukraine, which reduced the number of raions of Lviv Oblast to seven. The area of Zhovkva Raion was merged into Lviv Raion.

Attractions 
An architectural monument of local importance of the Zhovkva Raion is in the village Velyki Hrybovychi. It is the St. Cosmas and St. Damian's Greek Catholic Church, built in 1897 (1927-M). Construction of the church was started in 1897 and been completed in the 1906. Church was consecrated by Metropolitan Archbishop Andrey Sheptytsky on April 22, 1908.

Gallery

References

External links 
 village Velyki Hrybovychi
 Geographical Names; Velikiye Gribovichi: Ukraine
 Великі Грибовичі. Церква св. Кузьми і Дем’яна
 weather.in.ua

Literature 
 
Villages in Lviv Raion